Ryan Mendez may refer to:
Ryan Mendez (basketball) (born c. 1977),  basketball player
Ryan Mendez (guitarist), guitarist with Yellowcard